Stefania Colombo (born 30 March 1957) is a former Italian female long-distance runner who competed at individual senior level at the IAAF World Women's Road Race Championships and at the IAAF World Cross Country Championships (1988).

References

External links
 

1957 births
Living people
Italian female long-distance runners
Italian female cross country runners